Yaparka (Yapar) is a rural locality (a village) in Kushnarenkovsky Selsoviet, Kushnarenkovsky District, Bashkortostan, Russia. The population was 83 as of 2010. There are 2 streets.

Geography 
Yaparka is located 5 km north of Kushnarenkovo (the district's administrative centre) by road. Kushnarenkovo is the nearest rural locality.

References 

Rural localities in Kushnarenkovsky District